Shabana is a feminine given name. People named Shabana include:

Shabana (actress), Bangladeshi actress 
Shabana (dancer), a Pakistani dancer killed by the Taliban
Shabana Akhtar, Pakistani athlete
Shabana Azmi, Indian actress
Shabana Bakhsh, Scottish actress
Shabana Rehman Gaarder, Norwegian comedian
Shabana Mahmood, British politician

See also
Mohammed Shabana (b. 1931), Egyptian Air Force commander

Pakistani feminine given names